Ivan Pavlica (born 17 March 1945 in Yugoslavia) is a retired Croatian football player.

International career
He made his debut for Yugoslavia in a February 1969 friendly match against Sweden, his sole international appearance.

References

External links
 
 
Profile on Serbian federation official site
Profile - FC Metz

1945 births
Living people
Footballers from Zagreb
Association football forwards
Yugoslav footballers
Yugoslavia international footballers
NK Trešnjevka players
NK Zagreb players
HNK Hajduk Split players
FC Metz players
Yugoslav First League players
Ligue 1 players
Yugoslav expatriate footballers
Expatriate footballers in France
Yugoslav expatriate sportspeople in France